Berri Txarrak (Bad News in English) is a Navarrese rock power trio whose songs are sung in Basque. It was founded in 1994 in Lekunberri, Navarre, Spain.

History
Berri Txarrak originated in Lekunberri, Navarre, Spain in 1994 as a parallel project of Gorka Urbizu (vocals and guitar) and Aitor Goikoetxea (drums). In 1997 they began to focus fully on the band, which had two new members: Mikel López (bass) and Aitor Oreja (guitar).

After releasing a six-track demo, the band landed several awards in different demo and new act contests, which allowed them to record their eponymous album, released in autumn 1997. Berri Txarrak jumped to success within the Basque rock scene thanks to singles like "Lotsarik gabe", "500 urte ta gero" and "Ardifiziala". According to the band's members, that album was a step forward for their music and it became the base for their later works.

In 1999, the band released Ikasten. In this second album, Berri Txarrak's style had also evolved. Tracks such as "Ikusi arte", "Ez" or "Ikasten" allowed the band to offer a lot of live performances.

Two years later, in 2001, Eskuak/Ukabilak was released. It features acclaimed songs such as "Oihu", "Stereo" and "Biziraun", which earned them the Gaztea Saria award for best song of the year. With this album, the band gathered the attention of public and press from outside the Basque Country.

2003 was the year in which the band released their fourth album, Libre ©, to excellent critic acclaim and earning them their first tour on Europe (UK, Denmark and Germany). Libre © is Berri Txarrak's most hardcore album. The album won the best Spanish album of the year award from the magazine Rock Sound and Euskadi Gaztea. The album includes interesting songs such as "Denak ez du balio" (which features additional vocals from Rise Against's Tim McIlrath), "Hil nintzen eguna" and "Izena, izana, ezina".

After a long tour, the guitarist Aitor Oreja walked out. In 2005, Gorka, Aitor G and Mikel decided to carry on as a three-member band and focused on what would be Berri Txarrak's fifth album, Jaio.Musika.Hil. The band went on to tour across Mexico and Nicaragua. That year, Berri Txarrak toured the US. The band supported Rise Against on their 2006 European Tour. Currently, they are showing their new songs on tour.

Berri Txarrak has worked on many music compilations like Nafarroa, Hitza Dantzan (GOR, 2001), Tributo a Judas Priest (Zero Records, 2000) and the successful single "Bisai Berriak", composed in 2002.

In late 2008 they announced a new album for September 2009 with Roadrunner Records, recorded by Steve Albini at the Electrical Audio Studios in Chicago and featuring Tim McIlrath. A new single called Dortoken Mendean became available at their Myspace and at Roadrunner Records's official webpage on 29 June 2009.

In January 2011, Berri Txarrak was nominated for the 10th Annual Independent Music Awards for Best Punk Song for their song "Folklore." Also in 2011, the band engaged in their latest album, titled Haria (the Thread), with the recognized producer Ross Robinson (Slipknot, Korn). In February 2012, the album was presented and was followed with a tour around various countries.

In 2018 Urbizu recorded guest vocals for the all Basque hardcore punk band Adrenalized. The song was entitled "Gezurra Ari Du", which translates into English as "It's Raining Lies".

Influences
The band has been influenced by: Nirvana, Rage Against the Machine, Pedro the Lion, Weezer, New Order, Rise Against, and Neurosis, among others.

In songs like "Aspaldian utzitako Zelda" or "Mundua begiratzeko leihoak", they interpret poems and writings of Joseba Sarrionandia. In 2010, they made a version of the poem "Liluraren Kontra", written by the German poet Bertolt Brecht and popularized in Basque thanks to a song by Mikel Laboa.

Members
Gorka Urbizu (vocals, guitar)
Galder Izagirre (drums)
David Gonzalez (bass)

Discography

Albums
Unreleased demo (1994)
Berri Txarrak (1997, GOR Diskak)
Ikasten (1999, GOR Diskak)
Eskuak/Ukabilak (2001, GOR Diskak)
Libre © (2003, GOR Diskak)
Jaio.Musika.Hil (2005, GOR Diskak)
Payola (2009, Roadrunner Records)
Haria (2011, Roadrunner Records)
Denbora Da Poligrafo Bakarra (2014)
Infrasoinuak (2017)

EPs
Maketa (1995)

Compilations 
 Denak ez du balio (SINGLES 1997-2007) (2010, GOR Diskak)

Live albums 
Zertarako Amestu (2007, GOR Diskak)

External links
Official Website

References

Musical groups established in 1994
Spanish alternative metal musical groups
Spanish alternative rock groups
Nu metal musical groups
1994 establishments in Spain
Basque music bands
Musicians from Navarre